Nexus Music is a Danish record label and production company that was founded in 2002 by producers Jon & Jules (Jon Andersson Ørom and Johannes Jules Wolfson).

With more than 20 number 1s and more than 150 gold and platinum certifications, Nexus Music has become one of Denmark's most famous and best-selling production and record companies. The label has signed prominent artists like Nik & Jay, Alex, Ankerstjerne, Sisse Marie, Cisilia and Joey Moe. Nexus' artists has received numerous awards and certifications.

Nexus hold several remarkable records in the Danish music industry. They have signed and produced the best selling pop group of all time in Denmark (Nik & Jay), produced Denmark's biggest club hit of all time, "Yo-Yo" by Joey Moe, and signed and produced, Cisilia, the youngest winner ever of the Danish Music Awards (i.e. Danish Grammy) for Hit of the Year and Best New Artist.

This is a list of songs written and produced by the production team Nexus.

Singles

Albums

Non-single tracks

Songs contributed to albums not mentioned above:

See also 
 Clemens
 Erik & Kriss
 Burhan G
 J. Holiday
 Morten Breum
 Christian Brøns

External links
Official website

References

Danish record labels
Record labels established in 2002
2002 establishments in Denmark
Hip hop record labels
Contemporary R&B record labels
Pop record labels